Ampere North is a neighborhood and census-designated place (CDP) in Bloomfield Township, Essex County, New Jersey, United States. It is in the southern corner of the township, bordered to the north by the Watsessing CDP, to the northeast by Silver Lake, to the southwest by East Orange, and to the southeast by Newark. Ampere Parkway runs through the center of the CDP, from Bloomfield Avenue at the northeast border of the community, south into the Ampere neighborhood in East Orange.

Ampere North was first listed as a CDP prior to the 2020 census with a population of 5,132

Demographics

References 

Census-designated places in Essex County, New Jersey
Census-designated places in New Jersey
Bloomfield, New Jersey